Marcos Ruiz (born 13 October 1996) is a Spanish weightlifter. He represented Spain at the 2020 Summer Olympics in Tokyo, Japan.

He won two medals at the 2022 Mediterranean Games held in Oran, Algeria. He won the gold medal in the men's 102 kg Snatch event and the silver medal in the men's 102 kg Clean & Jerk event.

References

External links 
 

Living people
1996 births
Spanish male weightlifters
Weightlifters at the 2020 Summer Olympics
Olympic weightlifters of Spain
People from Molins de Rei
Sportspeople from the Province of Barcelona
European Weightlifting Championships medalists
Mediterranean Games medalists in weightlifting
Mediterranean Games gold medalists for Spain
Mediterranean Games silver medalists for Spain
Competitors at the 2022 Mediterranean Games
21st-century Spanish people